A computer module is a selection of independent electronic circuits packaged onto a circuit board to provide a basic function within a computer. An example might be an inverter or flip-flop, which would require two or more transistors and a small number of additional supporting devices. Modules would be inserted into a chassis and then wired together to produce a larger logic unit, like an adder.

History 
Modules were the basic building block of most early computer designs, until they started being replaced by integrated circuits in the 1960s, which were essentially an entire module packaged onto a single computer chip. Modules with discrete components continued to be used in specialist roles into the 1970s, notably high-speed modular designs like the CDC 8600, but advances in chip design led to the disappearance of the discrete-component module in the 1970s.

See also
Modularity

References

Modularity
Electronic engineering
Logic gates